Day at the Circus may refer to:

Day at the Circus (1901 film),  documentary short by Edwin S. Porter
Day at the Circus, a 2006 episode of American comedy series Robot Chicken; see List of Robot Chicken episodes
A Day at the Circus, working title of the 1939 Marx Brothers film At the Circus
A Day at the Circus, a 1987 program in the Kidsongs series

See also
A Day with the Circus, 1911 documentary short produced by William Nicholas Selig
Day After the Circus, 1897 film by American Mutoscope Company